Chaput is a surname of French origin. It may refer to:

Charles J. Chaput, Roman Catholic archbishop emeritus of Philadelphia
Henri Chaput, French surgeon
Jean Chaput, French World War I flying ace
Jean Marc Chaput, Canadian politician
Marcel Chaput, Canadian politician
Maria Chaput, Canadian senator
Michael Chaput, Canadian hockey player
Solange Chaput-Rolland, Canadian journalist, writer, and senator
Stefan Chaput, Canadian hockey player